The following television stations operate on virtual channel 55 in the United States:

 KAZD in Lake Dallas, Texas
 KTBU in Conroe, Texas
 W25FC-D in Jasper, Alabama
 WACX in Leesburg, Florida
 WACX-LD in Alachua, etc., Florida
 WBNX-TV in Akron, Ohio
 WFFT-TV in Fort Wayne, Indiana
 WFNA in Gulf Shores, Alabama
 WFXS-DT in Wittenberg, Wisconsin
 WLNY-TV in Riverhead, New York
 WMYT-TV in Rock Hill, South Carolina
 WPXE-TV in Kenosha, Wisconsin
 WRSP-TV in Springfield, Illinois
 WSST-LD in Albany, Georgia
 WYPX-TV in Amsterdam, New York

The following stations, which are no longer licensed, formerly operated on virtual channel 55 in the United States:
 K16HP-D in East Wenatchee, Washington
 KWVG-LD in Malaga, etc., Washington

References

55 virtual